The 2021–22 UC Davis Aggies men's basketball team represented the University of California, Davis in the 2021–22 NCAA Division I men's basketball season. The Aggies, led by 10th-year head coach Jim Les, played their home games at the University Credit Union Center in Davis, California as members of the Big West Conference.

Previous season
In a season limited due to the ongoing COVID-19 pandemic, the Aggies finished the 2020–21 season 10–8, 6–4 in Big West play to finish in fourth place. In the Big West tournament, they defeated Cal State Bakersfield in the quarterfinals, before falling to top-seeded UC Santa Barbara in the semifinals.

Roster

Schedule and results

|-
!colspan=12 style=| Exhibition

|-
!colspan=12 style=| Non-conference regular season

|-
!colspan=12 style=| Big West regular season

|-
!colspan=9 style=| Big West tournament

Source

References

UC Davis Aggies men's basketball seasons
UC Davis
UC Davis Aggies men's basketball
UC Davis Aggies men's basketball